Cheikh Tidiane Touré (born January 25, 1970) is a Senegal-born French athlete who specialised in the long jump. He retired after the 2003 season.

His best international performance came in the 1997 World Championships, where he finished 7th.

His personal best jump was 8.46, a result he achieved in Bad Langensalza on June 15, 1997. As this happened before he became a French citizen, the result was an African record which stood for over twelve years. Ignisious Gaisah of Ghana jumped 8.51 m at the 2006 African Championships in Athletics, but as the tail wind was too strong (+3.7 m/s) the result could not become a new record . On July 4, 2009, Godfrey Khotso Mokoena of South Africa jumped 8.50 m in Madrid setting a new record.

Competition record

1No mark in the final

External links

1970 births
Living people
French male long jumpers
Senegalese male long jumpers
Olympic athletes of France
Athletes (track and field) at the 1996 Summer Olympics
Olympic athletes of Senegal
Athletes (track and field) at the 2000 Summer Olympics
World Athletics Championships athletes for Senegal
World Athletics Championships athletes for France
Senegalese emigrants to France
African Games gold medalists for Senegal
African Games medalists in athletics (track and field)
Athletes (track and field) at the 1995 All-Africa Games
Athletes (track and field) at the 2001 Mediterranean Games
Mediterranean Games competitors for France